Leonardo Di Cesare  is an Argentine producer, film director, and screenplay writer.

He works in the cinema of Argentina.

His first film Buena Vida Delivey was a huge success in film festivals and was well received by film critics.

Filmography
Director, producer and writer
 Buena Vida Delivery (2004)

Awards
Wins
 Clarin Entertainment Awards: Clarin Award; Best First Work - Film; 2004.
 Mar del Plata Film Festival: Best Film, Leonardo Di Cesare; Best Screenplay, Leonardo Di Cesare and Hans Garrino: 2004.
 Toulouse Latin America Film Festival, France: Grand Prix; Leonardo Di Cesare; 2004.
 Valladolid International Film Festival, Spain: Best New Director, Leonardo Di Cesare; 2004.
 Argentine Film Critics Association Awards: Silver Condor; Best First Film, Leonardo Di Cesare; Best Original Screenplay, Leonardo Di Cesare and Hans Garrino; 2005.

References

External links
 
 

1968 births
Argentine film directors
Argentine film producers
Argentine screenwriters
Male screenwriters
Argentine male writers
Living people
Place of birth missing (living people)